dbDOS is software developed by dBase for Windows computers with Intel processors. dbDOS allows Intel-based PCs to run DOS Applications, such as dBASE III, dBASE IV (Version 1, 2, 3), and dBASE V for DOS in an emulated DOS environment.  It is an environment configured specifically to allow the various versions of dBASE for DOS to run without any changes to the dBASE executables or the dBASE compiled programs created.

The company dBase offers licenses for dBase CLASSIC (DOS).

Overview
In the late 1980s to early 1990s, dBase for DOS was one of the more popular database tools on the market.  When Borland decided to stop development of the DOS version in favor of the Windows version, many companies were left providing support for themselves.

Many decided to keep their applications running on the DOS platform for many years following Borland's switch to Windows.  This strategy worked well enough until Microsoft decided to make some changes in the way the underlying operating system worked.  And as more and more PC started supporting 64-bit operating systems, the ability to keep dBASE for DOS running on maintainable hardware became difficult.

In 2012, the newly formed dBase LLC opted to support this install base of dBASE applications by releasing a virtualization tool named dbDOS.  Based on the popular DOSBox, dbDOS quickly became an easy way to enable virtually any DOS-based application on Microsoft's Windows XP, Vista, Windows 7, Windows Server 2003 and Windows Server 2008, both 32- and 64-bit versions of the operating systems. With enhanced support for dBASE III, dBASE IV (Version 1, 2, 3), and dBASE V for DOS, dbDOS is the easiest way to keep mission critical applications up and running for years to come.

dbDOS 1.0 was released on May 23, 2012, following the restructuring of dBase LLC in April 2012.

System requirements
The dbDOS virtual machine requires an Intel-based personal computer running Microsoft Windows.  The computer must have at least 1 gigabyte of RAM and at least 100 megabytes of free hard drive space available.

Once the virtual machine software known as dbDOS is installed, the user is then free to install additional application software provide they have the originally licensed installation media available.

Features
 Easy to use wizard based interface supports importing and exporting of multiple environment configurations
 No modifications to dBASE or any other applications is required
 Ability to run any DOS programs* (BETA)
 Very small footprint, under 10 megabytes of storage needed for the running program
 Revive existing applications instead of rewriting them
 Original installation media and licence from the manufacturer is required to install and run applications within dbDOS

dBase dbDOS 1.1 was released as a free upgrade on June 22, 2012. New features in this release include:
 Ability to print ESC and printer specific codes to the host OS's printers (either networked or connected)

dBase dbDOS 1.5 was released as a free upgrade on September 25, 2012. New features in this release include:
 Increased overall performance.
 Enhanced memory capabilities with JEMM386 enable programs to run much faster
 Clipboard feature for pasting text into DOS from Windows

dBase dbDOS PRO 2 was released a new professional version on August 23, 2013. New features in this release include:
August 23, 2013 
 Enhanced printing capability to now closely resemble printouts from the 1980s and 1990s.
 New copy from Windows clipboard to dbDOS VM.
 New copy / paste from unique dbDOS buffer to Windows.
 Double the performance of the 1.x product.
 New Print Screen functionality introduced.
 Support for Windows 8

dBase dbDOS PRO 3 was released on May 2, 2014. New features in this release include:
May 2, 2014
PDF output to print to paper, to PDF, or to both at the same time
New print features – new “Enhanced” printing feature that provides a more accurate version of those reports than ever before
New print features – new “Direct” printing feature that handles more ESC codes and sequences for use when RAW, Interpreted, and Enhanced can not get it right (Expert Mode).
New print features – a print driver that will allow better print across new printers requiring one line code change
Easy DOS Configuration Wizard simplifies the setup and launching of a single dBASE program
Enhanced DOS SHELL functionality
Display for resolutions above 800x600 are 100% sharper and easier to read
Improved backup system that makes it easier to find the configuration

dBase dbDOS PRO 4 was released on May 6, 2015. New features in this release include:
May 6, 2014
New live files system allows to make changes outside of the dbDOS VM and see changes immediately inside the VM.
dbDOS PRO 4 engine is 38% faster than the last release
4DOS Integration – Will allow for more advanced command processing in the product and running DOS based scripts. 
New look – The new look makes the product easier to understand and use right out of the box.
Enhanced PDF print functionality.
Enhanced Display for resolutions above 800x600 are 100% sharper and easier to read.

dBase dbDOS PRO 4N was released on May 18, 2015. New features in this release include:
May 18, 2014
Multi-User Support
New live files system allows to make changes outside of the dbDOS VM and see changes immediately inside the VM
dbDOS PRO 4 is 38% faster than the last release
dbDOS PRO 4N is built on-top of the widely used dbDOS PRO 4 product and it includes all the features of that product

Architecture
dBase dbDOS has a unique architecture.

dbDOS CONFIG.EXE; The new dbDOS Configuration adds significant features to manage Windows shortcuts for running dBASE for DOS applications.  One of the main comments with the initial dbDOS 1.0 product was that end-users wanted to be able to manage the shortcuts, they wanted to be able to delete them, and they wanted a way to share them.  The new interface allows all of those features.
Windows Shortcut; an icon that is used to represent a specific executable program configured to run inside the dbDOS VM.  This will usually have a name under the icon on the desktop or on the start menu, which describes what program will be executed when selected.
dbDOS VM Virtual Machine (dbDOS VM); The dbDOS VM or VM stands for Virtual Machine and with dbDOS it is a DOS emulation that allows products developed for DOS-based application to run inside the virtual machine.  The VM supports the Windows Operating Systems (XP, 2003, Vista, 2008, 7, 8, 8.1) in either 32- or 64-bit editions.
Applications (.COM, .EXE, .BAT); One of the main goals from using the dbDOS Config.exe is to define a configuration that calls a .BAT, .COM, or a .EXE file to be executed inside the dbDOS VM.
Command Prompt; dbDOS CONFIG.EXE also allows configurations that will take the user to the command-prompt.  From the command-prompt the user can use it just like a DOS prompt.
MS-Print Spooler; Output from the dbDOS VM is sent directly to the Print Spooler for printout
Print Output;  Output is printed on the hardware available to the dbDOS VM.

Version history

See also
 Comparison of platform virtualization software
 Desktop virtualization
 Platform virtualization
 Virtual disk image
 DOS
 Paradox (database)
 FoxPro
 Lotus 1-2-3

References

External links
dBase dbDOS official website
dBase official website

Virtualization software
MacOS software
DOS emulators